Richard Houston Dudley (July 29, 1836 – August 30, 1914)  was an American Democratic politician, Confederate soldier and businessman. He served as the Mayor of Nashville, Tennessee from 1897 to 1900.

Early life
Dudley was born near Shelbyville in Bedford County, Tennessee on July 29, 1836.

Career
Dudley served in the Confederate States Army during the American Civil War of 1861-1865. In  May 1861, he enlisted in Company I, Maney's 1st Tennessee Infantry.

In 1873, Dudley moved to Nashville where was a member of the wholesale grocery firm of Ordlay, Dudley and McGuire, and the hardware firm of Dudley Brothers & Lipscomb. He served as Mayor of Nashville from 1897 to 1900. He was supported by Democrats and Irish Americans who lived in Nashville during his campaign.

Personal life
Dudley was married to Mattie Rose in September, 1865. She died soon after and he remarried to Mary E. Beasley on April 4, 1868, who died in 1907. He had no children.

Dudley died on August 30, 1914.

References

External links

1836 births
1914 deaths
Confederate States Army soldiers
Tennessee Democrats
Mayors of Nashville, Tennessee
People from Bedford County, Tennessee
People of Tennessee in the American Civil War
19th-century American politicians